Love on the Run is a 1994 American TV film directed by Ted Kotcheff and Julie Lee.

Plot
A mercenary marries an heiress and set up an adventure-travel business.

Cast
Anthony Addabbo as Frank Powers
Noelle Beck as Ava Cross
Len Cariou as Noah Cross
Blu Mankuma as Ray Valentine
Nada Despotovich as Margot
Byron Lucas as Steve
Anna Hagan as Ashton
French Tickner as Airport Guard
Charles Andre as Leo
Fred Perron as Doug
David Lewis as Ranger
Ken Tremblett as Mountie

References

External links
Love on the Run at TCMDB
Love on the Run at IMDb

1994 television films
1994 films
Films directed by Ted Kotcheff